Koppole is a combination of two divisions in Ongole city, Prakasam district in the state of Andhra Pradesh, India.

History 
The town's history dates from 230 BCE with the era of the Mauryas and Sathavahanas who ruled most of what is now present-day Andhra Pradesh. A few inscriptions dating to the Satavahana period have been found in the village China Ganjam, near Ongole. After the Satavahanas, this place came into the limelight

References 
2.https://pincodes.info/in/Andhra-Pradesh/Prakasam/Koppole/Koppolu-Rural-Koppole
Villages in Prakasam district